England and the Continent in the Tenth Century: Studies in Honour of Wilhelm Levison (1876–1947) is a 2010 book edited by David Rollason, Conrad Leyser and Hannah Williams.

References

2010 non-fiction books
English-language books
History books about England
British non-fiction books